Nico Visser du Plessis (born ) is a South African rugby union player for Valorugby Emilia in the Top12 in Italy. His regular position is prop.

He joined Italian side Valorugby Emilia prior to the 2018–19 Top12 season.

References

South African rugby union players
Living people
1993 births
Rugby union players from Pretoria
Rugby union props
Golden Lions players